The Gibson L5S is a solid-body electric guitar model produced by the Gibson Guitar Corporation.

Introduced in 1972, the Gibson L5S was essentially a smaller, thinner solid-body version of the popular Gibson L-5 hollowbody. Like the L-5, it featured multiple binding on the single-cutaway 3-ply solid maple body, 5-piece maple neck, and headstock, and also featured an ebony fingerboard with block inlays. The headstock featured a flower-pot inlay similar to the L-5 archtop and most L5S models featured the L-5 trapeze tailpiece (though some had stop-bar or TP-6 fine-tuning tailpieces). The L5S was available in various finishes, such as ebony, cherry sunburst, wine red and natural.

Upon its introduction in 1972, the L5S featured two low-impedance pickups, similar to those found on several Gibson Les Paul models of that period, such as the Recording model, the Signature model, the Personal model, and the Professional model. This incarnation of the model was not a success, however, thus Gibson switched from low-impedance pickups to regular humbucker pickups. Though it was considered one of Gibson's more top-of-the-line models, it was still not particularly popular among guitarists. In the mid-1980s, the L5S was dropped from the Gibson line.

Notable L5S players 

The L5S was a unique high-end solid body, and once Gibson adorned it with super humbuckers, famous guitarists took notice, especially jazz and fusion virtuosos like Pat Martino and John McLaughlin. Additionally other players picked up the L5S such as Paul Simon and others including possibly Keith Richards at one time. Ronnie Wood has been seen playing a new incarnation of the Gibson L5S which is currently a signature model in production, the 'Ronnie Wood L-5S'as well as Mark Farner from Grand Funk.

References 

L5S